Didia is a genus of snout moths. It was described by Ragonot in 1893.

Species
 Didia diehli Roesler & Küppers, 1981
 Didia fuscostriatella Yamanaka, 2006
 Didia striatella (Inoue, 1959)
 Didia subramosella Ragonot, 1893

References

Phycitini
Pyralidae genera